The Cosby Cup was the trophy given to the champions of the Ontario Hockey Association from its founding in 1890 until its replacement in 1899 by the J. Ross Robertson Cup for senior ice hockey.

History
The Cosby Cup was donated by businessman A. Morgan Cosby. The OHA playoffs at the time consisted of play-downs from a limited number of teams. At the start, there was Lindsay, Ottawa, Kingston Queen's University, Toronto Osgoode Hall, Toronto St. George's and Toronto Granites. These were the only teams of the OHA upon its founding, but the league started adding divisions in 1896, splitting into junior, intermediate and senior.

The Cosby Cup was awarded to the senior champions until the John Ross Robertson trophies were donated in 1899. The Cosby Cup was given permanently to Queen's University.

Winners

References and notes
 

Canadian ice hockey trophies and awards
Ice hockey in Ontario
Ontario awards
Ontario Hockey Association
Senior ice hockey